"Lihaaf" ("The Quilt") is a 1942 Urdu short story written by Ismat Chughtai. Published in the Urdu literary journal Adab-i-Latif, it led to much controversy, uproar and an obscenity trial, where Ismat had to defend herself in the Lahore Court. She was asked to apologize and refused, winning the case, after her lawyer pointed out that the story makes no suggestion to a sexual act, and prosecution witnesses could not point out any obscene words: the story is merely suggestive and told from perspective of a small girl. 

In the coming decades it was widely anthologised, and became one of her most known works, besides Angarey, which remained banned for several decades. Years later, she mentioned in detail the court trial in her memoir, Kaghazi Hai Pairahan (A Life in Words: Memoir). Though it received attention for its suggestion of lesbianism, it also deals with the insulated and suffocating life of a neglected wife in a feudal society. It became a landmark for its early depiction of sex, still (Jan. 1995) a taboo in modern Indian literature, let alone Urdu literature.

Storyline 

The story is told from the point of view of a small girl who is the niece of the protagonist, Begum Jan. Begum Jan has had a very depressing life after marriage. Her husband, the Nawab, was much older than her and was thought to be extremely respectable for never having had any encounters with prostitutes. But it is soon revealed that it is because his interests lie in the other gender. The lonely Begum starts to wither but is saved by Rabbo, her masseuse. Rabbo is a servant girl who is not so pretty but very deft with her hands. When the narrator is left at Begum Jan's place by her mother, she realises that despite her past admiration of love for Begum Jan, there lie many secrets with her. At night, the great shadows formed by the quilt of Begum Jan and her odd behavior in the absence of Rabbo bring to light their hidden relationship, traumatising the narrator.

Film adaptations
Fire, a 1996 Hindi film directed by Deepa Mehta and starring Shabana Azmi and Nandita Das was loosely based on the short story. The short story was adapted to short film by the same name directed by Rohan Sonawane. Lihaaf: The Quilt is a 2019 Indian Hindi-language period drama film based on the story; directed by Rahat Kazmi, starring Anushka Sen, Tannishtha Chatterjee, Mir Sarwar, Sonal Sehgal, Shoib Nikash Shah, Namita Lal and Virendra Saxena.

Bibliography
 The Quilt and Other Stories, New Delhi, Kali for Women, 1996.

References

External links

 Dossier 18: Lihaf* (The Quilt)
 http://www.writersasylum.in/2013/08/reviews/ismat-chughtais-lihaf-a-short-note/
 http://www.museindia.com/regularcontent.asp?issid=46&id=3792
 Ismat Chughtai's Short Stories 
 Ismat Chughtai (1915-1991)

Indian short stories
Urdu-language fiction
1942 short stories
Obscenity controversies in literature
Short stories adapted into films
LGBT literature in India
Feminist short stories
1940s LGBT literature
Urdu-language novels